Hwang Shin-duk (6 November 1898 – 22 November 1983) was a South Korean journalist, activist, educator and politician. In 1946 she was one of the four women who were appointed to the Interim Legislative Assembly, becoming South Korea's first female legislators.

Biography
Shin-duck was born in Pyongyang in 1898, a member of the Jaeahn Hwang clan. She attended Soongeui Girl's High School in Pyongyang until 1919 and then studied at Waseda University and the Japan Women's University in Japan, graduating in 1926. After returning to Korea, she worked as reporter for several newspapers, including the Dong-a Ilbo. She also participated in the anti-Japanese March 1st Movement and in 1927 became a member of the Singanhoe.

Following the end of World War II, the United States Army Military Government established an Interim Legislative Assembly with 90 members; 45 elected and 45 appointed by Military Governor John R. Hodge. Although women were unable to vote in the election, Hodge appointed four women, including Hwang, who was a representative of the Patriotic Women's Association. After the Assembly was dissolved in 1948, she was a government spokeswoman until 1950.

She was abducted by North Korea in 1950, but escaped. In 1952 she established the Women's Issues Research Association, and in 1956 founded the Family Law Consultation Centre. She later founded Chugye University for the Arts. She died in Seoul in 1983.

References

1898 births
Jaeahn Hwang clan
Waseda University alumni
Japan Women's University alumni
Korean independence activists
Korean journalists
20th-century South Korean women politicians
20th-century South Korean politicians
Members of the Interim Legislative Assembly
1983 deaths